Riddle is an unincorporated community in Ohio Township, Crawford County, Indiana.

History
A post office was established at Riddle in 1892, and remained in operation until it was discontinued in 1951. It was named for Colonel Riddle.

Geography

References

Unincorporated communities in Crawford County, Indiana
Unincorporated communities in Indiana